The Little Lotus Manor or Xiaolianzhuang was built by the Qing dynasty merchant Liu Yong (1826-1899) in 1885 as his private garden. The center piece here is an immense lotus pond anchoring the southeastern end of the pond is a Western-style two-story red brick house that was used as a retreat for the women of the house. To the southeast are two stone memorial archways.

See also
 List of Chinese gardens

References

Botanical gardens in China
Major National Historical and Cultural Sites in Zhejiang
Buildings and structures in Huzhou